Iralco or the Irish Aluminium Company is the former name of a car parts manufacturer situated in Collinstown, North Westmeath. The company was one of the longest-established manufacturers in Ireland and was initially established in 1964 by Franz Pohl, a German entrepreneur. 

It produces components for car manufacturers including Audi, BMW, Ford, Seat, Volkswagen, Volvo and Jaguar.

In August 2008 the company was taken over by C&F Automotive Limited, and in 2018 was sold to Decotek Automotive Limited. At the time of the 2018 sale, it had approximately 390 employees.

References

Companies of the Republic of Ireland
Manufacturing companies established in 1964
County Westmeath
2008 mergers and acquisitions
2018 mergers and acquisitions
Irish companies established in 1964